The 2022 Cork Premier Senior Hurling Championship was the third staging of the Cork Premier Senior Hurling Championship and the 134th staging overall of a championship for the top-ranking hurling teams in Cork. The draw for the group stage placings took place on 8 February 2022. The championship ran from 7 June to 16 October 2022.

Midleton entered the championship as the defending champions, however, they failed to qualify for the knockout stage after losing two games and finishing bottom of Group A. Na Piarsaigh's relegation ended 65 years of top tier hurling for the club.

The final was played on 16 October 2022 at Páirc Uí Chaoimh in Cork, between Blackrock and St. Finbarr's, in what was their first meeting in the final in 40 years. St. Finbarr's won the match by 2–14 to 1–07 to claim their 26th championship title overall and a first title in 29 years.

Stephen Condon and Ben Cunningham were the championship's joint-top scorers.

Team changes

To Championship

Promoted from the Cork Senior A Hurling Championship
 Kanturk

From Championship

Relegated to the Cork Senior A Hurling Championship
 Carrigtwohill

Participating teams

Clubs

The seedings were based on final group stage positions from the 2021 championship.

Divisions and colleges

Group A

Group A table

Group A results

Group B

Group B table

Group B results

Group C

Group C table

Group C results

Divisional/colleges sections

Preliminary stage

Semi-finals 

 Imokilly, MTU Cork and University College Cork received byes to this stage.

Final

Knockout stage

Bracket

Relegation playoff

Quarter-finals

Semi-finals

Final

Championship statistics

Top scorers

Overall

In a single game

Miscellaneous
 Na Piarsaigh are relegated after 65 years in the senior championship.  
 Newtownshandrum qualified for the semi-final stage for the first time since 2011.
 St. Finbarr's qualified for the final for the first time since 1993.
 St. Finbarr's and Blackrock face each other in the final for the first time since 1982.
 St. Finbarr's win the title for the first time since 1993.

References

External links
 Cork GAA website

Cork Senior Hurling Championship
Cork
Cork Premier Senior Hurling Championship